Charline is a French feminine given name and a French feminine form of Charles.

Given names
Charline Arthur (1929–1987), American singer
Charline Effah (born 1977), Gabonese writer
Charline Joiner (born 1988), Scottish cyclist
Charline Labonté (born 1982), Canadian ice hockey player.
Charline Mathias (born 1992), Luxembourgian middle-distance athlete 
Charline Picon (born 1984), French windsurfer
Charline Van Snick (born 1990), Belgian judoka
Charline von Heyl (born 1960), German painter
Charline White (1920–1959), first African-American woman to be elected to the Michigan Legislature

See also

Charlaine
Charlene (given name)
Charlie (name)
Charlin (name)
Charlyne

Notes

French feminine given names